
Gmina Mrągowo is a rural gmina (administrative district) in Mrągowo County, Warmian-Masurian Voivodeship, in northern Poland. Its seat is the town of Mrągowo, although the town is not part of the territory of the gmina.

The gmina contains part of the protected area called Masurian Landscape Park.

Villages
Gmina Mrągowo contains the villages and settlements of Bagienice, Bagienice Małe, Bagnowski Dwór, Boża Wólka, Boże, Boże Małe, Brodzikowo, Budziska, Czerniak, Czerwonki, Dobroszewo, Gązwa, Głazowo, Gniazdowo, Grabowo, Gronowo, Gwiazdowo, Joachimowo, Karwie, Kiersztanowo, Kosewo, Kosewo Górne, Krzosowo, Krzywe, Kucze, Lasowiec, Lembruk, Marcinkowo, Miejski Las, Mierzejewo, Młynowo, Muntowo, Nikutowo, Notyst Dolny, Notyst Mały, Notyst Wielki, Nowe Bagienice, Nowy Probark, Palestyna, Pełkowo, Piotrówka, Polska Wieś, Popowo Salęckie, Porębiska, Poręby, Probark, Ruska Wieś, Rydwągi, Sądry, Śniadowo, Sobięcin, Szczerzbowo, Szestno, Troszczykowo, Tymnikowo, Użranki, Wierzbowo, Witomin, Wola Muntowska, Wólka Bagnowska, Wólka Baranowska, Wymysły, Wyszembork, Zalec and Zawada.

Neighbouring gminas
Gmina Mrągowo is bordered by the town of Mrągowo and by the gminas of Kętrzyn, Mikołajki, Piecki, Reszel, Ryn and Sorkwity.

References
Polish official population figures 2006

Mragowo
Mrągowo County